

Results

External links

1951 beauty pageants
1951 in Israel
Miss Israel
1950s in Tel Aviv